Stephanie Hightower (born July 19, 1958) is an American former hurdler and former president of USA Track & Field (USATF). She is a four-time U.S. Champion at 100 meter hurdles and a five-time U.S. Indoor Champion at 60 meter hurdles. She also won the 1980 U.S. Olympic Trials, but was prevented from competing in the Moscow Olympics due to the boycott. She won a silver medal at the 1987 Pan American Games.

Hightower became president of USA Track & Field in December 2008. She resigned as chair of the USATF board in April 2015 and was elected to the IAAF Council in August 2015 She resigned as president of USATF in December 2016.

Running
Born in Louisville, Kentucky, Hightower was a collegiate track star at Ohio State University. From 1977 to 1980, she did not lose a race in the 60-meter dash, 60-meter hurdles or the 100-meter hurdles, and earned Big Ten Conference, NCAA and National championship titles. She was unable to participate in the 1980 Summer Olympics due to the US boycott of the games. She did however receive one of 461 Congressional Gold Medals created especially for the spurned athletes. Hightower missed the 1984 Summer Olympics, finishing fourth in what looked like a four-way tie at the Olympic Trials. Kim Turner won the race in 13.12 seconds, with Benita Fitzgerald-Brown in second, Pam Page in third and Hightower in fourth, all running 13.13 seconds, in what was possibly the closest elite race in history. The photo of the finish was later used for instruction in the use of photo finish devices.

Administration
Twenty eight years later, as President of USATF, Hightower was part of the administrative committee formed to settle another controversial close finish, when Jeneba Tarmoh and Allyson Felix tied for the final qualifying spot in the 2012 Olympic Trials.

After retiring from competition, Hightower has held various positions with the USATF, including serving as women's team manager at the 2004 Athens Olympic Games. She is currently the President and CEO of the Columbus Urban League. In addition, she has served in the Columbus Mayor's cabinet for Sports Development. In 2011, Hightower was discussed as a possibility for the USATF's CEO position until the board decided on Max Siegel.

Hightower is the niece of American Football Hall of Famer Paul Warfield. and wife of former world cross country champion Ian Stewart.

National titles
Four-time U.S. 100 meter hurdles Champion (1980, 1981, 1982 and 1984)
Five-time U.S. Indoor 60 meter hurdles Champion (1980, 1982, 1983, 1984 and 1986)
 Won 1980 USA Olympic Trials

International competitions

See also

References

External links 
 - Biography page on USATF Official site

1958 births
Living people
Ohio State Buckeyes women's track and field athletes
Ohio State University alumni
American female sprinters
American female hurdlers
Sportspeople from Columbus, Ohio
Athletes (track and field) at the 1987 Pan American Games
Columbus College of Art and Design
Pan American Games silver medalists for the United States
Pan American Games medalists in athletics (track and field)
Congressional Gold Medal recipients
Universiade medalists in athletics (track and field)
Athletics (track and field) administrators
Universiade gold medalists for the United States
Medalists at the 1981 Summer Universiade
Medalists at the 1987 Pan American Games
20th-century American women
21st-century American women